Soar is a small village or hamlet in Gwynedd, Wales.

It has no school; children in the hamlet go to school in Talsarnau, which is a short walk down the hillside.

There is a small park at the top of the hill in Soar (on your left as you drive up) with swings and climbing equipment. Parking is limited as it lies next to private houses which look out onto the park.

External links 

www.geograph.co.uk : photos of Soar and surrounding area

Villages in Gwynedd
Villages in Snowdonia
Talsarnau